"Rufst du, mein Vaterland?" ("Call'st thou, my Fatherland?") is the former national anthem of Switzerland. It had the status of de facto national anthem from the formation of Switzerland as a federal state in the 1840s, until 1961, when it was replaced by the Swiss Psalm.

The text was written in 1811 by Bernese philosophy professor Johann Rudolf Wyss, as a "war song for Swiss artillerymen". It is set to the tune of the British royal anthem "God Save the King" (c. 1745), a tune which became widely adopted in Europe, first as the German hymn "Heil, unserm Bunde Heil" (August Niemann, 1781), somewhat later as "Heil dir im Siegerkranz" (Heinrich Harries 1790, originally with Danish lyrics, the German adaptation for use in Prussia dates to 1795), and as anthem of the United States, "My Country, 'Tis of Thee" (1831).

In Switzerland during the 1840s and 1850s, the hymn was regularly sung at patriotic events and at political conventions. It is referred to as "the national anthem" (die Nationalhymne) in 1857, in the contest of a "serenade" performed for general Guillaume Henri Dufour. The Scottish physician John Forbes, who visited Switzerland in 1848, likewise reports that the tune of 'God Save the King' "seems to be adopted as the national anthem of the Swiss also".

As in the American "My Country, 'Tis of Thee", the lyrics replace the image of the monarch with that of the fatherland, and the promise to defend it "with heart and hand" (mit Herz und Hand), the "hand" replacing the "voice" praising the king of the original lyrics. The pact to defend the homeland militarily is made explicit in the first verse,

The German lyrics were translated into French in 1857, as the result of a competition sponsored by the Societé de Zofingue of Geneva. The competition was won by  Henri Roehrich (1837– 1913), at the time a student of philosophy, whose text is less explicitly martial than the German lyrics, beginning  "O free mountains / echo our calls / our songs of liberty" and comparing the Rütli oath with a Republican Liberty Tree.

Yet in spite of the Republican sentiment in the lyrics, the tune remained more strongly associated with royalism and conservativism, and it remained the anthem of the British, the German and the Russian empires. This fact, and the lack of association of the tune with Switzerland in particular, led to the desire to find a replacement, which came in the form of the Swiss Psalm (composed 1841), from 1961 as a provisional experiment, and since 1981 permanently.

Lyrics

German
The poem by Wyss was first printed in 1811 in a collection of "war songs" (Kriegslieder), under the title of Vaterlandslied für Schweizerische Kanonier ("patriotic song for Swiss artillerymen"). The original poem as printed in 1811 had six verses. From as early as 1819, Wyss' fifth verse was lost, with two final verses added, for a total of seven verses. The first of the added verses makes reference to William Tell, and the second one invokes the rewards of peace after war (while in the original version, the final two verses compare the report of artillery and the impact of canister shot to thunder and avalanches, respectively).

The 1819 version is under the title of "war song for Swiss defenders of the fatherland" (Kriegslied für schweizerische Vaterlandsvertheidiger). It does not credit Wyss, and indicates the tune as that of "God save the king, etc." In this particular version, Wyss' reference to the Battle of St. Jakob an der Birs is replaced by reference to the Battle of Laupen, because of the immediate context of the publication, dedicated to a commemoration of this latter battle. Similarly, an 1825 variant inserts reference to the Battle of Dornach.

A version printed in 1833 in a collection of traditional and patriotic songs gives the title An das Vaterland ("To the Fatherland"), with the tune identified as that of "Heil! unserm Bunde Heil!".

The following gives the original text of the 1811 version alongside the text of the full seven verses as current in the 1830s. Abridged versions of the lyrics as used in the role of national anthem often reduce the text from seven to three verses, giving either verses 1, 2, 6 or alternatively 1, 3, 6 (as numbered below). Since the hymn never had official status, there are slight textual variants even between these surviving verses. A version printed in 1867, well after the song had become established as de facto national anthem, still gives five verses, omitting only verses 4 and 5 (as numbered below).

French

The 1857 French version by Henri Roehrich (1837– 1913) has four verses, which are not direct translations of the German text.

Italian
Towards the end of the 19th century, when the song's status as de facto national anthem had become fixed, it was desirable to have a singable version in Italian, the third official language of Switzerland (Romansh was not officially recognized as a separate language until 1938). An Italian version printed in a 1896 songbook for schools has two verses, a close translation of the first two versions of the German lyrics.

Notes

References

External links 

Swiss patriotic songs
Historical national anthems
European anthems
National symbols of Switzerland
National anthem compositions in G major
God Save the King